Abul Hassan Mahmood Ali (born 2 June 1943) is a Bangladeshi politician and diplomat who served as parliamentarian and cabinet minister including the Foreign Minister of Bangladesh from 2013 to 2019. He previously served as Minister of Disaster Management and Relief from 2012 to 2013.

Early life and education
Ali was born on 2 June 1943 in Daktarpara, Khamar Bishnuganj (Tangua Post Office), Khansama, Dinajpur (now in Bangladesh). He received a B.A. with Honours (1962) and an M.A. degree in economics (1963) from Dhaka University. He was a lecturer in economics at Dhaka University from 1964 to 1966.

Diplomatic career
Ali joined the Pakistan Foreign Service (then including Bangladesh) in 1966 and was posted as Vice-Consul of Pakistan in New York City in 1968. Immediately after arriving in New York in 1968, he began to organise the small Bangladeshi community in the United States. Ali joined the Bangladesh Liberation war, in April 1971, and was appointed as the representative to the United States from the provisional government of Bangladesh at Mujibnagar, in May 1971. Ali fought for Bangladesh independence in the US and at the United Nations. He was executive assistant to Justice Abu Sayeed Chowdhury, Chief Overseas Representative of the Mujibnagar government, and leader of the Bangladesh delegation to the United Nations.

After the declaration of Bangladesh's independence, Ali served as representative to the United Nations and later as Acting Consul-General in New York City. Subsequently, he served in various capacities at the Foreign Ministry in Dhaka and at Bangladesh missions abroad. He served, from 1977 to 1979, as First Secretary, Counsellor and Deputy High Commissioner in New Delhi, India. At the foreign ministry, from 1979 to 1982, Ali served as Director-General for Administration, for International Organisations, for United Nations Department of Economic and Social Affairs, for Policy Planning for South Asia, and for Human Rights. From 1983 to 1986, Ali was Deputy Chief of Mission with the rank of Ambassador, in Beijing, China. From 1986 to 1990, he was Ambassador to Bhutan.

As Additional Foreign Secretary (Bilateral), Ali handled South Asia and Human Rights among other subjects. He negotiated and signed the agreement for the Tin Bigha Corridor Implementation Agreement with India, in 1992, and negotiated the Burmese Refugees Repatriation Agreement with Myanmar in 1992. Ali was Ambassador to Germany, with concurrent accreditation to Austria, the Czech Republic, and Slovakia, from 1992 to 1995; Ambassador to Nepal from February to October 1996; and High Commissioner to the United Kingdom, with concurrent accreditation to Ireland, from 1996 to 2001.

Political career
After retiring from active diplomatic service, in April 2001, Ali entered politics, joining the Bangladesh Awami League. He served as a member of the Awami League Central Election Committee and was appointed a member of the Central Advisory Council of the Awami League (December 2002). He was subsequently appointed co-chairman of the Awami League Subcommittee on International Affairs.

In December 2008, Ali was elected to parliament as an Awami League candidate, representing a rural constituency in Dinajpur, in northern Bangladesh. He was elected Chairman of the Parliamentary Standing Committee on the Ministry of Foreign Affairs. He received Government appointments to serve on various other important committees. He was appointed to the Cabinet on 13 September 2012 and assumed charge of the newly created Ministry of Disaster Management and Relief, as Minister, on 16 September 2012. Ali was appointed Minister for Foreign Affairs in the government formed on 21 November 2013. He was re-appointed on 26 February 2014, following his re-election in the parliamentary elections of January 2014.

Political positions

Ali has been critical of Rohingya in Bangladesh, and has stated that he considers Rakhine Muslims to be a national security threat.

Family
Ali has a wife and two grown sons.

References

External links
 Ministry of Disaster Management and Relief website
 Life sketch of Mr Mahmood Ali from Ministry of Disaster Management and Relief 
 List of Ministries (general site link, English version available)

Awami League politicians
10th Jatiya Sangsad members
Foreign ministers of Bangladesh
Ambassadors of Bangladesh to Germany
Academic staff of the University of Dhaka
University of Dhaka alumni
People from Dinajpur District, Bangladesh
1943 births
Living people
Disaster Management and Relief ministers of Bangladesh
11th Jatiya Sangsad members
9th Jatiya Sangsad members